Gemma-Leah Devereux (born 9 August 1990) is an Irish actress. She is known for playing Liza Minnelli in the biographical drama film Judy (2019) opposite Renée Zellweger. Also as Lady Fitzgerald in the fourth and final season of the television series The Tudors (2010).

Personal and early life
Gemma-Leah Mary Devereux was born in Dublin, Republic of Ireland, the daughter of Irene and Francis Devereux. Her mother is a renowned hairdresser. She is the youngest of four children. She wanted to be an actress from a very early age, and has stated, "I've never wanted to be anything else". Devereux attended Loreto College St Stephens Green and left school at the age of 16. That same year she moved to London to study drama. She trained at the Arts Educational Schools, London for three years.

Acting career
Devereux made her acting debut as Lady Elizabeth Fitzgerald in Showtime's historical fiction television series The Tudors.   with Jonathan Rhys Meyers and Henry Cavill. Shortly afterwards she made her theatrical westend debut in The Dreamers of Inishdara at the Jermyn Street Theatre alongside Rocky Horror Show star Patricia Quinn. In 2012 she was cast as her first leading role in a feature film as Kate alongside Ross Noble and Tommy Knight in Stitches directed by Conor McMahon which premiered at Film4 Frightfest 2012 in Empire Leicester Square. That same year she was cast in Comedown, an urban horror-thriller film about a group of South-East London teenagers break into an abandoned tower block to install an aerial for a Pirate Radio Station. It is directed by Menhaj Huda, and starring Adam Deacon, Geoff Bell, Jessica Barden, and Jacob Anderson. The film had its premiere at the Grimmfest 2012 film festival on 4 October. In 2013 she joined Casualty as nurse Aoife O'Reilly. She filmed 14 episodes before her exit. That same year she starred opposite Brian Gleeson in How To Be Happy which follows relationship counsellor Cormac Kavanagh (Gleeson) who starts sleeping with his clients in a misguided attempt to reignite their passions but gets in-tangled when he starts falling for Flor (Devereux), the attractive young private detective assigned to investigate his affairs. In 2014 she starred opposite Killian Scott and Peter Coonan in Get Up And Go an indie film about four 20 something years olds who face a cross road over one day. For her performance in this role she was nominated for Best Supporting Actress at the 2016 Irish Film & Television Academy Awards. In 2015 she starred opposite Callum Blue, Rebecca Knight and David Hayman in psychological thriller Dartmoor Killing which won "Best thriller" at the National Film awards. That same year she filmed feature film Poison Pen;  Property of the State opposite Patrick Gibson, Aisling Loftus and Elaine Cassidy. In 2016 she was cast in Simon Bird's directorial debut Ernestine & Kit with Pauline Collins and Rosaleen Linehan. The following year she was cast opposite John Connors in Mark O'Connor's Cardboard Gangsters. The story follows a group of young lads in Darndale, led by Jay Connolly ( Connors), who sell drugs to make a living. It became the highest-grossing film that year. She was cast as a heroin addict in RTE's legal drama Striking Out with Neil Morrissey and Amy Huberman. In 2018 she played Ruth Shine opposite Tom Vaughan-Lawlor in the docudrama Citizen Lane about the life of art dealer Hugh Lane. That same year she was cast opposite John Connors again in Paddy Slattery's directional debut Broken Law. In 2019 she starred as Ciara in RTE's Comedy Drama Bump; a story of two sisters who have been very much at odds since they were young with Charlene McKenna playing her sister and Seán McGinley playing her Father. That same year she filmed period drama Dead Still alongside Michael Smiley and Eileen O'Higgins directed by Imogen Murphy. In 2018 it was announced Devereux would be playing Liza Minnelli in the upcoming Biopic Judy of Judy Garland's life opposite Renée Zellweger as Judy Garland directed by Rupert Goold. Principal photography began on 19 March 2018, in London. Filming locations included West London Film Studios. The film premiered at the Telluride Film Festival on 30 August 2019, and was theatrically released in the United States on 27 September 2019, and in the United Kingdom on 2 October 2019.

Filmography

References

External links

Wikipedia articles in need of updating from November 2019
1990 births
Irish film actresses
Irish television actresses
Living people
People educated at the Arts Educational Schools
Actresses from Dublin (city)
21st-century Irish actresses
Irish expatriates in England
People educated at Loreto College, St Stephen's Green